Time Flies is a 1944 British comedy film directed by Walter Forde and starring Tommy Handley, Evelyn Dall, Felix Aylmer and Moore Marriott. The screenplay concerns two music hall performers, an inventor and a con-man who travel back to Elizabethan times using a time machine.

Plot

A professor invents a time sphere which takes a group of 1940s entertainers to Elizabethan London, where they encounter Queen Elizabeth and Sir Walter Raleigh and introduce them to jazz culture.

They also meet Captain John Smith and a very heavy-drinking Pocahontas. The main female character meets William Shakespeare and feeds him some of his own lines, which he eagerly writes down.

A costume-production, (many of which are immaculate), which makes extensive use of the Gainsborough wardrobe.

Cast
 Tommy Handley – Tommy
 Evelyn Dall – Susie Barton
 George Moon – Bill Barton
 Felix Aylmer – The Professor
 Moore Marriott – A Soothsayer
 Graham Moffatt – His Nephew
 John Salew – William Shakespeare
 Leslie Bradley – Captain Walter Raleigh
 Olga Lindo – Queen Elizabeth
 Roy Emerton – Captain John Smith
 Iris Lang – Princess Pocahontas
 Stéphane Grappelli – A Troubadour

Critical reception
Sky Cinema gave the film two out of five stars, its review stating: "Despite the subject and the cast, the treatment lacks vivacity". TV Guide rated it similarly: "A well-tuned script takes full advantages of the possibilities for comedy, but radio star Handley is a bit of a disappointment, looking sourly out of place on the screen"; The Radio Times rated it three out of five stars, concluding: "Some of the jokes have travelled less well and it falls flat in places, but it's a thoroughly entertaining romp".

References

External links

1944 films
British historical comedy films
1940s historical comedy films
Films directed by Walter Forde
Gainsborough Pictures films
Films about time travel
British black-and-white films
Films set in London
Films set in the 16th century
Films set in Tudor England
1940s English-language films
1940s British films